Printemps (meaning "springtime" in French) is a French department store chain (literally "big store"). The Printemps stores focus on beauty, lifestyle, fashion, accessories, and men's wear. The Printemps was a founder and has been a member of the International Association of department stores from 1928 to 1997, an international body still active as of today. The flagship Printemps store is located on Boulevard Haussmann in the 9th arrondissement of Paris, along with other well-known department stores like Galeries Lafayette. There are other Printemps stores in Paris and throughout France.

Early history (1865-1940)
Printemps was founded on the 3rd of November, 1865 by Jules Jaluzot and Jean-Alfred Duclos. The original store was designed by noted architects Jules and Paul Sédille and opened at the corner of Le Havre and Boulevard Haussmann in Paris, France, on 3 November 1865. The building was greatly expanded in 1874, and elevators (then a great novelty) from the 1867 Universal Exposition were installed. Rebuilt after a fire in 1881, the store became the first to use electric lighting, in 1888. (Customers could observe the workings of the power plant behind a glass wall.) It was also one of the first department stores with direct subway access, the Metro being connected in 1904.

The policies of Printemps revolutionized retail business practices. The store marked items with set prices and eschewed the haggling based on customer appearance that had previously been standard in retail shopping. Like other  (literally "big store", department store), Printemps used the economies of scale to provide high quality goods at prices that the expanding middle class could afford. They also pioneered the idea of discount sales to clear outdated stock, and later the use of window models to display the latest fashions. Printemps was noted for its branding innovations as well, handing out bouquets of violets on the first day of spring and championing the new Art Nouveau style, with its nature inspired motifs.

In 1904, a near collapse of the business led to the resignation of Jules Jaluzot. He was succeeded by Gustave Laguionie, who the following year announced the construction of a second store. This location, designed by architect Rene Binet, opened five years later and is famously dominated by a glass domed hall 42 meters in height, and a noted Art Nouveau staircase. (Removed in 1955.) The first store outside of Paris was opened in 1912 in Deauville. Pierre Laguionie, the son of Gustave, took the helm of the store in 1920, rebuilding it after another large fire in 1921. In 1931, Printemps created the discount chain Prisunic.

In 1923 with the reconstruction of the store an elaborate cupola was installed above the main restaurant. In 1939 to avoid the risk of the cupola being destroyed in bombing attacks it was dismantled and store at Clichy It was restored in 1973 by the grandson of its original designer, using plans that had been kept in the archives of the family business. In 1975, the façade and cupola of the building were registered as historical monuments.

Pierre Lagionie has been the first president of the International Association of Department Stores in 1928, a position he held again in 1937 and 1952. Jean-Jacques Delort was president in 1981.

The figures of the Four Seasons on the façade were sculpted by French sculptor Henri Chapu. Jaluzot was replaced as owner in 1900 by Gustave Laguionie, after the business came close to collapse. In the early 20th century, the building was then extended along the Boulevard Haussmann by architect René Binet in an art nouveau style. The building burned down, and its interior was rebuilt in the 1920s.

Expansion (1970-1989) 
By 1970 there were 23 Printemps locations and 13 Prisunic discount outlets.  The oil-price driven French economic crisis of the early 1970s significantly threatened Printemps business model, in response the firm was transformed into a limited corporation with a controlling interest acquired by Maus Fréres, a Swiss holding company. During the 1970s Jean-Jacques Delort led the company on a turnaround strategy creating specialty stores and brands (Such as Armand Thierry clothing and branching out into different areas such as food and mail.

In 1981 the company started an international expansion by franchising stores it started with the opening of a location in Kobe, Japan, they continued the expansion a year later opening a store in Sapporo.

In September 1983 a store opened in Singapore on the ground floor of the newly built Le Meridien Hotel on Orchard Road.

In 1984 two new locations opened in Jeddah, Saudi Arabia and in Petaling Jaya, Malaysia a second store opened in Malaysia in 1985 in Kuala Lumpur. Two more stores opened in Japan in Ginza and Osaka.

A store opened in Denver on November 6, 1987 the first and only ever location in the Americas, the store was located at Broadway Plaza and was just over 88,000 square metres, the store had a French bistro. Business slowed after the first few months and a shuttle bus started operating from Downtown Denver but alas in April 1989 the location closed.

In 1988 two new locations opened in Istanbul, Turkey and Seoul, South Korea.

The Singapore store closed in December 1989 after 6 years of operation.

Recent years (1990-Now) 
In 1991 Printemps & its subsidiaries were acquired by François Pinault and merged with other holdings into Pinault-Printemps-Redoute (PPR, was renamed Kering in 2013). That year a store also opened in Cascais, Portugal.

In 1994 a store opened in Bangkok, Thailand.

In 1995 a location opened in Taipei, the store opened under a franchise agreement and was operated by the Taiwan based The Jieh Enterprises A store also opened in Shanghai.

In 1997 the flagship Haussmann store's renovation was completed.

A franchise in Ratu Plaza, Jakarta which was suppose to open in 1998 was under construction but due to the Asian financial crisis and the May 1998 riots the franchise did not open.

In 2006 Printemps was sold to the Italian Borletti Group (with equity partner Deutsche Bank), they then made major investments to revamp stores.

On 16 December 2008, the Paris department store Printemps Haussmann was evacuated following a bomb threat from the terrorist group FRA (Afghan Revolutionary Front). The demining services found five sticks of dynamite in the toilet of the store. The FRA claimed this assassination attempt and demanded the withdrawal of 3,000 French soldiers deployed in Afghanistan.

On July 31, 2013, Divine Investments SA (DiSA) a Luxembourg based, Qatari backed investment fund bought Printemps On the 4th of August labor organisations in France asked the Paris prosecutors office to open a preliminary inquiry into the sale, in response to a complaint from labour representatives.  On August 8 the French Court rejected the request to stop the sale.

On January 15, 2014 Printemps opened its first new store in 32 years at the Carrousel du Louvre shopping mall in Paris

In 2017 the last international store closed in Ginza, Tokyo and was converted into an extension of the nearby Marronnier Gate department store, the closing of the store ended a period of international expansion around the world.

In May 2019 plans were announced to open a store in Galleria Vittorio Emanuele in Milan it would be 2,500 square metres and would open in 2021, but due to the COVID-19 Pandemic plans were scrapped.

In 2020 due to the COVID-19 Pandemic it was announced that 4 Printemps stores would close (Le Havre, Strasbourg, Metz & Place d'Italie).

In March 2022 it was announced that a Printemps store would open in Doha, Qatar in September, this will be the first new store since the COVID-19 pandemic. The store will open in November 2022 schedueled to open in time before the kick off of the 2022 FIFA World Cup.

In September 2022, Printemps announced that they would open a 2 level 54,000-square-foot at One Wall Street in New York City, expected to open in Spring 2024. This will be Printemps second modern international store. (There were previously international stores around the world until 2017 when the last closed in Ginza, Tokyo), the interior will be designed by Paris based interior designer Laura Gonzalez and the store will be overseen by Laura Lendrum as CEO of Printemps America she previously worked at Kering, Yves Saint Laurent and Ralph Lauren.

In early November 2022, Printemps Doha opened to the public, the store is 3 floors has 14 restaurants and is over 40,000 sqm and the largest luxury department store in the Middle East, 200 brands are exclusive to the store and over 600 brands are in the store in total.

See also
 List of works by Henri Chapu

References

External links

  Official site focusing on the flagship Paris store.
  Groupe Printemps includes information on other stores.
 

Shops in Paris
Department stores of France
Retail companies of France
Buildings and structures in the 9th arrondissement of Paris
Art Nouveau architecture in Paris
Art Nouveau retail buildings
Commercial buildings completed in 1865